Jessica Shirvington, née Pagent, (born in Sydney on 15 April 1979) is an Australian author. She is best known for her book series Embrace, also called The Violet Eden Chapters.

They have two daughters and a son.

References

External links 

 Official Website of Jessica Shirvington
 

Writers from Sydney
1979 births
Living people
Australian women novelists
21st-century Australian novelists
21st-century Australian women writers